Charles Lewis (born 14 November 1968) is a Belizean former cyclist. He competed in the team time trial at the 1988 Summer Olympics.

References

External links
 

1968 births
Living people
Belizean male cyclists
Commonwealth Games competitors for Belize
Cyclists at the 1994 Commonwealth Games
Olympic cyclists of Belize
Cyclists at the 1988 Summer Olympics
Place of birth missing (living people)